Corroy may refer to:
Corroy, County Mayo, Ireland
Corroy, Marne, France
Alexis of Nassau-Corroy, bastard son of Henry III of Nassau-Breda
Castle of Corroy-le-Château